Taksta (previously CEM-102) is a front-loaded oral dosing regimen of sodium fusidate under development in the U.S. as an antibiotic for gram-positive infections including drug-resistant strains such as methicillin-resistant Staphylococcus aureus (MRSA).

Clinical trials
Jan 2010: Taksta has completed enrollment in a Phase 2 trial (due to run until March 2010) and is preparing for Phase 3 studies in the U.S. for acute bacterial skin structure infections (being compared with Linezolid).

Sep 2010: Taksta demonstrated comparable clinical success rates compared to linezolid in a Phase 2 trial in the U.S. for acute bacterial skin and skin structure infections.

Jun 2011: Taksta may be effective in the treatment of chronic prosthetic joint infections and osteomyelitis.

Dec 2015: Cempra Doses First Patient in Phase 3 Clinical Trial of Taksta(TM) in Acute Bacterial Skin and Skin Structure Infections. (2015) 

Nov 2016: Cempra completes Phase 3 Clinical Trial of Taksta(TM) in Acute Bacterial Skin and Skin Structure Infections. Results remain pending. (2016) 

Feb 2017: Cempra achieves the primary endpoint of a 10% non-inferiority margin. The microbiological success in each ME population with methicillin-resistant S. aureus (MRSA) infection is 100 percent (99/99) at both the EOT and PTE visits. (2017)

See also
 Fusidic acid, licensed for some decades outside the US and is in clinical development in the U.S.

References

Antibiotics